Paleoworld (season 4) is the fourth season of Paleoworld.

List of episodes (in original order)

Paleoworld